Mariane Ibrahim-Lenhardt is a Somali-French art dealer based in Chicago, Illinois. She runs the eponymous Mariane Ibrahim Gallery.

Early life and career
Mariane Ibrahim Abdi was born in Nouméa, New Caledonia and grew up in Somaliland and France. She studied advertising in London and worked in marketing in the United Kingdom. In the early 2000s, a trip to Paris started her interest in contemporary African art after she saw a photograph by Seydou Keïta being sold.

Gallery
In 2012, Ibrahim founded the M. I. A. Gallery in Seattle as a way to showcase artists from underrepresented regions such as Africa and the Middle East, focusing primarily on African and African diaspora artists. M. I. A. was an acronym for both the phrase "Missing in Art" and her birth name. She opened the gallery with an exhibit of photos from the Malian artist Malick Sidibé. In 2017, Ibrahim won the first Presents booth prize at The Armory Show for her exhibition of photography and textile artist, Zohra Opoku.

The gallery's name was changed to Mariane Ibrahim Gallery and in September 2019 Ibrahim moved her gallery to Chicago, Illinois in the West Town neighborhood. She opened the new gallery with an exhibition of Ayana V. Jackson's photography titled, "Take Me to the Water," which explored African water spirits. In 2021, a second space opened in a renovated three-story space on Avenue Matignon in Paris’s 8th arrondissement. In 2022, the gallery announced plans to add a two-level,  exhibition space in Mexico City’s Cuauhtémoc neighborhood.

Among others, Mariane Ibrahim Gallery represents the following living artists:
 Amoako Boafo
 Florine Démosthène
 Clotilde Jiménez
 Thenjiwe Nkosi
 Zohra Opoku
 Ferrari Sheppard (since 2022)
 Lina Iris Viktor

Controversy
In 2018, Ibrahim supported artist Lina Iris Viktor in a lawsuit against rapper Kendrick Lamar and R&B star SZA over allegations that a music video for their song “All the Stars” — featured on the soundtrack to the movie Black Panther — drew from Viktor’s work without permission. The parties later agreed to settle on terms that could not be discussed as part of the agreement, though not before 10 months of high-profile media attention was paid to issues surrounding artists’ rights.

Personal life
Ibrahim is married to Pierre Lenhardt. She is Muslim.

References

French art dealers
New Caledonian women

Year of birth missing (living people)
Living people
People from Nouméa
French people of Somali descent